Alpha United (Georgetown)
 Bakewell Topp XX (Linden)
 Buxton United (East Demerara)
 Camptown (Georgetown)
 Guyana Defence Force (Georgetown)
 Liquid Gold (Bartica)
 Milerock (Linden)
 New Amsterdam United
 Rosignol United (Berbice)
 Seawall (West Demerara)
 Slingerz FC (East Bank Demerara)
 Victoria Kings (East Demerara)
 Western Tigers (Georgetown)

Guyana
 
Football
Football clubs